The Mollusk is the sixth studio album by American rock band Ween, released by Elektra Records on June 24, 1997. It is a multi-genre concept album with a dark nautical theme, with most songs incorporating elements from psychedelia and/or sea shanties, while also featuring a heavy progressive rock influence. Dean Ween described the album as "the only record that I ever felt really confident about" and "my favorite record we've ever done." Gene Ween has echoed this sentiment, saying: "The Mollusk is probably my favorite, at the end of the day."

Background
Starting with the release of their 1994 album Chocolate and Cheese, Aaron Freeman and Mickey Melchiondo—known by their stage names Gene and Dean Ween, respectively—began to significantly enhance their approach to studio recording. While their earlier albums were almost entirely recorded by Freeman and Melchiondo themselves at their home using a 4-track recorder, Chocolate and Cheese marked the first time the band produced an album in a professional recording studio. It also notably began their transition from a duo to a more traditional band with the addition of drummer Claude Coleman, allowing Freeman and Melchiondo to experiment with a wider range of musical styles than they could with the drum machine they had used on previous releases.

Though Ween's 1996 album 12 Golden Country Greats was their first record to feature a full-fledged band on each track, the songs were recorded with various Nashville session musicians, so it was viewed by the band as more of a spin-off album, in the vein of The Beach Boys' Christmas Album, than a true follow-up to Chocolate and Cheese. The Mollusk was the debut album for keyboardist Glenn McClelland, and, with bassist Dave Dreiwitz joining shortly before the album’s release, the band finally evolved into the final five-man incarnation that continues to this day.

The cover art for The Mollusk was created by Storm Thorgerson, the graphic designer who designed many of Pink Floyd's album covers, including The Dark Side of the Moon. Thorgerson liked the album so much that, although he was only hired to do the cover art, he decided to do the related promo and poster art, including all of the initial print ads associated with The Mollusk, for no extra charge.

Recording
After recording 1994's Chocolate and Cheese in a professional studio, Gene and Dean Ween decided they wanted to return to their early method of recording albums at home.  In 1995, they relocated their recording equipment to a rented beach house on the shore of Holgate, New Jersey, and the equipment and some of the early materials for the album were nearly lost when a water pipe burst in the house while it was unoccupied.  At this point, the band put this album on hold and made plans to record 1996's 12 Golden Country Greats in Nashville. After recording 12 Golden Country Greats in 1995 and releasing and touring behind it, Ween completed the remaining tracking of The Mollusk at various inland locations. The album was finished in 1996 and released on June 24, 1997.

Reception

Consequence of Sound included the album on their list of the 50 best albums from 1997.

Influence
The Mollusk was a direct influence on the animated television series SpongeBob SquarePants. Stephen Hillenburg, the show's creator, contacted the band shortly after the album's release, and he requested a song from them which later became "Loop de Loop". The track "Ocean Man" is played during the end credits of The SpongeBob SquarePants Movie.

Kurt Vile named "Mutilated Lips" his favorite song of all time, and recalled that the album "blew [his] mind" when he listened to it as a teenager.

Track listing

Notes
 "I'm Dancing in the Show Tonight" is a re-working of the 1953 Christmas song, "Are My Ears on Straight?", which was initially recorded by then-10-year-old Gayla Peevey and released as the B-side of "I Want a Hippopotamus for Christmas".

The Mollusk Sessions
The Mollusk Sessions is a compilation album released digitally for free trading by the band in 2007. It contains a combination of demo tracks from The Mollusk and songs recorded for the album which were cut prior to pressing.

Track listing

Personnel

Ween
 Dean Ween – guitar, vocals, engineering
 Gene Ween – guitar, vocals, engineering
 Dave Dreiwitz – bass
 Glenn McClelland – keyboards
 Claude Coleman Jr. – drums, percussion, engineering
Additional musicians
 Mean Ween – bass
 Kirk Miller – sound effects
 Bill Fowler – guitar, bass
Production
 Juan Garcia – assistant engineering
 Bill McNamera – assistant engineering
 Steve Nebesney – assistant engineering
 Mick Preston – assistant engineering
 Ralph Smith – assistant engineering
 Jim Woolsey – assistant engineering
 Andrew Weiss – production, engineering, mixing
 Peter Curzon – artwork
 Tom Nichols – photography
 Rupert Truman – photography
 Sam Brooks – cover design
 Finlay Cowan – cover design
 Storm Thorgerson – cover design
 Matt Kohut
 Jason Reddy

Charts

References

Ween albums
1997 albums
Albums with cover art by Storm Thorgerson
Elektra Records albums
Concept albums
Maritime music